Wife in Name Only is a 1923 American silent drama film directed by George Terwilliger and starring Mary Thurman, Arthur Housman, and Edmund Lowe.

Plot
As described in a film magazine review, the wealthy and beautiful Philippa L'Estrange falls in love with Norman Arleigh. She plans revenge when she learns that he does not return her affection, and her scheme brings about a wedding between Norman and Madeline Dornham. She then informs him that the bride's father is the murderer of his mother. This causes a separation between the newly married pair. Eventually, Norman discovers that the accusation is false. Norman and his bride are reunited.

Cast

Preservation
With no prints of Wife in Name Only located in any film archives, it is a lost film.

References

Bibliography
 Goble, Alan. The Complete Index to Literary Sources in Film. Walter de Gruyter, 1999.

External links

1923 films
1923 drama films
1920s English-language films
American silent feature films
Silent American drama films
Films directed by George Terwilliger
American black-and-white films
Selznick Pictures films
1920s American films